William Fraser (January 31, 1916 – January 15, 1997) was a Canadian athlete who played as an ice hockey goaltender and a centre half in soccer.

Early life 
Fraser was born in Winnipeg. He played junior hockey for the Winnipeg Maple Leafs before playing for Winnipeg CNR and the Weyburn Beavers. He then moved to Nova Scotia where he played for Sydney and Glace Bay before switching to the Quebec league where he played for the Montreal Sr. Canadiens.

Career 
Fraser played for the Buffalo Bisons before joining the Ottawa Senators' senior team where he played from 1945 to 1952.

In soccer, he initially played as a centre forward. In 1939, he helped Winnipeg Irish win the Manitoba Cup and reach the semi-finals of the Canadian National Championships. He then played for Dome Mines in 1940. He then helped Winnipeg Scottish FC win Manitoba Cup provincial titles in 1947, 1949, 1950 and 1951. The team were eliminated in the national semi-finals in 1949 and 1951, but reached the final in both 1947 and 1950.

Alongside hockey and soccer, he also played softball as a second baseman. After retiring as an athlete, Fraser worked as a head coach in the Saskatchewan Junior Hockey League with the Melville Millionaires, Prince Albert Mintos and Moose Jaw Canucks.

Awards and achievements
 MJHL Championship (1936)
 Allan Cup Championship (1949)
 "Honoured Member" of the Manitoba Hockey Hall of Fame
 Manitoba Cup soccer Championship (1939, 1947, 1949, 1950, 1951)

External links

Bill Fraser's biography at Manitoba Hockey Hall of Fame

1916 births
1997 deaths
Buffalo Bisons (AHL) players
Canadian ice hockey goaltenders
Elmwood Maple Leafs players
Ice hockey people from Winnipeg
Canadian expatriate sportspeople in the United States
Canadian expatriate ice hockey players in the United States
Canadian ice hockey coaches
Soccer players from Winnipeg